The Houston Christian Huskies, HCU  or Huskies (formerly known as Houston Baptist, HBU) are the athletic teams that represent Houston Christian University, located in Houston, Texas, in intercollegiate sports as a member of the Division I level of the National Collegiate Athletic Association (NCAA), primarily competing in the Southland Conference for most of its sports since the 2013–14 academic year; while its men's soccer team competes in the Western Athletic Conference (WAC). The Huskies previously competed the D-I Great West Conference from 2008–09 to 2012–13 after spending one season as an NCAA D-I Independent during the 2007–08 school year (since returning to NCAA D-I as a transitional member); in the Red River Athletic Conference (RRAC) of the National Association of Intercollegiate Athletics (NAIA) from 1998–99 to 2006–07; and as an NAIA Independent from 1989–90 to 1997–98. Houston Christian's (HCU) official school colors are royal blue and orange.

History
With the inception of the athletics program at the university in 1960 until 1990 the Huskies were a part of the NCAA. After playing for seventeen years as a member of the NAIA, the Huskies began play as an NCAA Division I team again in 2007 and became a full member of the NCAA for the 2011–12 academic year.

After one year of independent status in the NCAA, HCU joined the Great West Conference, and began play as a member in 2008 for all sports but basketball, baseball, softball, volleyball, and women's soccer.  These teams remained independent until the 2009–2010 season when they joined the other HCU teams. Men's soccer joined the Mountain Pacific Sports Federation since the Great West did not sponsor the sport.

On November 9, 2011, officials from the Southland Conference visited HCU in their expansion drive. On November 21, Houston Baptist accepted an invitation to join the Southland Conference joining July 1, 2013.  The school started a football program in 2013 and began Southland play in 2014. There are also plans for a new basketball arena. With  the Mountain Pacific Sports Federation dropping men's soccer after the 2012 season, the HCU team moved to the Western Athletic Conference, which began sponsoring the sport from 2013 onwards.

Varsity teams 
HCU competes in 17 intercollegiate varsity sports: Men's sports include baseball, basketball, cross country, football, golf, soccer and track and field (indoor and outdoor); while women's sports include basketball, beach volleyball, cross country, golf, soccer, softball, track and field (indoor and outdoor) and volleyball.

Venues and facilities

See also
List of NCAA Division I institutions

References

External links